The Federation of Malaya was a federation of what previously had been British Malaya, comprising eleven states (nine Malay states and two of the British Straits Settlements, Penang and Malacca) that existed from 1 February 1948 until 16 September 1963. The Federation became independent on 31 August 1957, and in 1963, Malaysia was formed when Malaya united with Singapore, North Borneo, and Sarawak.

History
From 1946 to 1948, the eleven states formed a single British crown colony known as the Malayan Union. Due to opposition from Malay nationalists, the Union was disbanded and replaced by the Federation of Malaya, which restored the symbolic positions of the rulers of the Malay states.

Within the Federation, while the Malay states were protectorates of the United Kingdom, Penang and Malacca remained British colonial territories. Like the Malayan Union before it, the Federation did not include Singapore, despite its traditional connections with Malaya.

The Federation of Malaya Agreement was formulated by the British–Malay Pleno Conference between June and December 1946. At the end of the meeting, the Pleno Conference produced a 100-page "Blue Book." It was signed on 21 January 1948 at King House by the Malay rulers, and by Sir Edward Gent as the representative of the British government. The Agreement superseded the Agreement creating the Malayan Union, and prepared for the establishment of the Federation of Malaya on 1 February 1948. The position of the Malay rulers was also restored.

The Federation became independent from British colonial rule and became an independent member of the Commonwealth of Nations on 31 August 1957. In 1963, the Federation was reconstituted as "Malaysia" when it federated with the British territories of Singapore, Sarawak, and North Borneo; a claim to the latter territory was maintained by the Philippines. Singapore separated from Malaysia to become an independent republic on 9 August 1965.

List of member states
 
 
 
  First 1948
  Under Merdeka
 
 
  First.
  Under Merdeka
 
 
 
  First
  Second

System of government
The government of the Federation of Malaya was headed by a British High Commissioner with executive powers, assisted and advised by the Federation of Malaya Executive Council and the Federation of Malaya Legislative Council.
 The Federation of Malaya Executive Council comprised 7 official and 7 unofficial members.
 The Federation of Malaya Legislative Council comprised the High Commissioner as the Council President, 14 official and 50 unofficial members representing the Straits Settlements, business groups and all races. Additionally, 9 State Council Yang Di Pertua (heads of state), Chief Ministers and 2 representatives from the Straits Settlements became unofficial members.
 The Malay Conference of Rulers would advise the High Commissioner on immigration issues. The British Resident was replaced with a Chief Minister in each state of the federation.

Conditions of citizenship
The conditions of citizenship of the Federation of Malaya were further tightened using law enforcement and naturalisation by application. Under the laws, the following were automatically granted citizenship:
 Citizens of the Sultan of any state
 British subjects born in Penang or Malacca who have lived continuously for 15 years in the federation
 British subjects born in the federation whose fathers were born or lived continuously for 15 years in the federation
 Anyone born in the federation, conversant in the Malay language and following Malay traditions in his or her daily life
 Anyone born in the federation whose parents were born and lived continuously for 15 years in the federation

Via naturalisation (by application), one could achieve citizenship, given these criteria:

 Born and lived for at least 8 of 12 years in the Federation of Malaya before the application was made
 Lived in the Federation of Malaya for at least 15 of 20 years before the application was made

In both cases (via naturalisation), applications must be well-behaved, swear allegiance and clarify their reasons for living in the federation, and are fluent in either the Malay or the English language.

The Federation of Malaya, through its constitution, guarantees the rights and special position of the Malay people as well as rights, powers and sovereignty of the Malay rulers in their respective states.

Separation of powers of the federal and state governments
The federation agreement (Perjanjian Persekutuan) set the powers of the federal and state governments. Financial matters must be handled by the respective states. The Sultan was given full power on religious issues and Malay customs. Foreign policy and defence continued to be administered by the British government. The federation agreement was made the Constitution of the Federation of Malaya and officially declared on 1 February 1948.

Federation of Malaya Legislative Council

The Federation of Malaya Legislative Council held its first meeting in the Tuanku Abdul Rahman Hall, Kuala Lumpur in 1948. It was opened by the British High Commissioner Sir Edward Gent. Attendees included the British Minister of State for Colonial Affairs, Lord Listowel. The membership of the Council was structured to include:
 the British High Commissioner (as President);
 3 ex officio members (namely the Chief Secretary, the Financial Secretary, and the Attorney General);
 11 "State and Settlement Members" (the President of the Council of State of each Malay state, and a member elected by each of the Settlement Councils)
 11 official members; and
 34 appointed "unofficial" members.

The unofficial members were required to be either Federation citizens or British subjects.

In 1948 the ethnic composition of the council was made up as follows:
 28 Malay representatives, including all the chief ministers,
 14 Chinese representatives,
 6 Indian representatives, and
 14 Europeans (the ex officio and official members).

Dato' Onn Jaafar stressed at the first meeting that the citizens of the Federation of Malaya did not want the interference of external powers in the affairs of the Federation; the Chinese representative Dr Ong Chong Keng asserted that the Chinese people would be loyal to the Federation of Malaya. At this first Council meeting, several minor committees were formed:
 the Standing Committee on Finance;
 the Election Committee; and
 the Committee of Privileges.

The first session passed the Kuala Lumpur City Bill, the Transfer of Power Bill, and the Loan and Debt Bill.

Registration of PKMM rejected
In 1950, the Federation of Malaya Government rejected the registration of the Malay Nationalist Party of Malaya (Parti Kebangsaan Melayu Malaya, PKMM) as a legitimate political party. PKMM had two wings, namely Angkatan Pemuda Insaf and Angkatan Wanita Sedar. Initially, PKMM did not have communist leanings. After Mokhtaruddin Lasso was elected as the first PKMM president in October 1946, this party was influenced with communism. The Young Malays Union (Kesatuan Melayu Muda, KMM) merged with PKMM, and Dr Burhanuddin al-Helmy became the second PKMM president. Dr Burhanuddin led PKMM toward the formation of Melayu Raya, a merger of Indonesia and Malaya. In December 1947, Ishak Haji Mohamed became the third PKMM president and PKMM switched from communism to nationalism. PKMM tended against United Malays National Organisation (UMNO) and colonisation. PKKM established the Pusat Tenaga Rakyat (PUTERA), a conglomeration of radical Malay Political Parties and then merged with the All-Malaya Council of Joint Action (AMCJA) which thoroughly opposed the 1948 Federation Agreement for the foundation of the Federation of Malaya. PKMM accused officials selected in the Federation of Malaya of being "puppets" of the "Colonial Office". For PKMM, there was no basis in "preparing Malaya as a democratic government".

Judiciary
The judicial system was a typical hierarchical structure consisting of lower courts, a High Court and a Court of Appeal. Successive Chief Justices were Sir Stafford Foster-Sutton (1952–1953) (afterwards Chief Justice of Nigeria, 1955), Sir Charles Mathew (1953–1956) and Sir James Beveridge Thomson (1957–1963).

Demographics

Evolution of Malaysia

See also
 Federation of Malaya Independence Act 1957
 Federal Legislative Council
 Peninsular Malaysia
 Malayan Emergency
 Reid Commission

References

External links

 Colonial administration records (migrated archives): Malaya at The National Archives (Pg. 52)
 The UK Statute Law Database: Federation of Malaya Independence Act 1957 (c. 60)
 United Nations Treaty Collection: No.10760: Agreement relating to Malaysia
 

 
States and territories established in 1948
States and territories established in 1957
States and territories disestablished in 1963
Malaya
British Malaya
Former countries in Malaysian history
History of Singapore
Malaya, Federation of
Malaya, Federation of
1948 establishments in British Malaya
1948 establishments in Malaya
1963 disestablishments in Malaya
1940s in British Malaya
1950s in British Malaya
Former member states of the United Nations